Under the Same Skin is a 1962 Argentine drama film directed by Daniel Tinayre. It was entered into the 12th Berlin International Film Festival.

Cast
 Mirtha Legrand
 Silvia Legrand
 Jorge Mistral
 Mecha Ortiz as Madre Superiora
 Maurice Jouvet

References

External links

1962 films
1960s Spanish-language films
Argentine black-and-white films
Films directed by Daniel Tinayre
1960s Argentine films